Squadron Leader Sarfaraz Ahmed Rafiqui   was a fighter pilot in the Pakistan Air Force who is known for his gallant actions in two of the aerial dogfights during Indo-Pakistani War of 1965, and is a recipient of both the Hilal-e-Jurat (Crescent of Courage) and the Sitara-e-Jurat (Star of Courage) military awards from the Government of Pakistan.

Early life 
Sarfraz Ahmed Rafiqui was born in Rajshahi, British India (present-day Bangladesh) on 18 July 1935. He had three brothers and a sister. He started his education at St. Anthony High School, Lahore, matriculating from Government High School, Multan in 1948. With the transfer of his father to Karachi, he joined D. J. Sindh Government Science College.

Military career 
Inspired by his elder brother "Ijaz Rafique", Sarfaraz joined the Royal Pakistan Air Force's 13th GDP course and graduated from Risalpur Academy in 1953.

In 1962, he was appointed as the Officer Commanding of the No. 14 Squadron which was based in Tejgaon Airport at East Pakistan (Present day Bangladesh). In 1963, he was posted at PAF Base Sargodha to lead the PAF's No. 5 Squadron which he would command till his martyrdom.

1965 War

Air Battle over Chammb 
On the evening of 1 September 1965, Indian Air Force intervened at Chhamb Sector by sending 26 aircraft (12 de Havilland Vampires and 14 Mystere IVs) to slow down the Pakistan Army's XII Division's offensive against Akhnoor in response to an SOS from the Indian Army. The IAF's 45 Squadron was ordered to provide Close Air Support to Indian forces in the area. These 26 planes flying in finger-four formation strafed Pakistani positions and attacked Pakistani tanks and ground targets, however when these Indian planes were sighted, the Pakistan Air Force (PAF) scrambled two F-86 Sabres, flown by S/L Sarfraz Rafiqui of No 5 Sqn and F/L Imtiaz Bhatti of No 15 Sqn from Sargodha to intercept them. Though heavily outnumbered, the two pilots engaged the Indians and in the ensuing dogfight over Chhamb, both pilots shot down two de Havilland Vampire each. Rafiqui had took on flight leader and wingman while Bhatti had went after element leader and element wingman.

India acknowledged losing four aeroplanes, all 4 IAF Vampires, flown by Squadron Leader Aspi Kekobad Bhagwagar (flight leader), Flight Lieutenant Vijay Madhav Joshi (element leader), Flight Lieutenant Satish Bharadwaj (element wingman) and Flight Lieutenant (later Group Captain) Shrikrishna Vishnu Phatak (wingman). Both PAF pilots were credited with shooting down two de Havilland Vampires each and were awarded with Sitara-e-Jurrat for this mission. This dogfight was a major blow to the IAF since it had to recall all vampires from frontline service to reduce losses.

Halwara Airstrike & subsequent death 
On 6 September 1965, in response to India's Invasion of Pakistan, the Pakistan Air Force launched an aggressive airstrike campaign on several Indian Air Force stations. Sarfaraz Rafiqui was tasked to lead a formation of three F-86 Sabres to strike the IAF's Halwara Air Base along with Flight Lieutenant Khawaja Younus Hussain as his number 2 and Flight Lieutenant Cecil Chaudhry as number 3. The formation took off from PAF Base Sargodha and headed towards Halwara. On the way, the formation met up with Squadron Leader MM Alam's formation which was returning from an aborted raid on the IAF's Adampur Air Force Station who informed them about their encounter with 4 Indian Hakwer Hunters over Tarn Taran (Alam had shot down one of them while the rest managed to escape). Nevertheless, Rafiqui's formation continued their flight and reached the Halwara base in the evening where the remaining 3 hunters from the earlier encounter with MM Alam's formation were taxiing back after landing. Just as Rafiqui was positioning himself for a strafing run, two IAF Hunters (flown by Flg Off P S Pingale and Flg Off A R Ghandhi) on a Combat Air Patrol intercepted his formation. Rafiqui quickly aborted his strafing run and engaged Pingale. He manoeuvred behind the enemy hunter and shot it down. Rafiqui then engaged Gandhi's Hunter scoring several hits on the enemy plane when suddenly his Sabre's 50 cal machine guns jammed. He then Radio'ed Cecil Chaudhry and said:
 Cecil, my guns have stopped firing, you have the lead.

While Rafiqui was positioning himself as Cecil's Wingman, Gandhi managed to get behind Rafiqui but failed to score any hits on the Sabre due to his poor aim. Minutes later, Gandhi was shot down by Cecil as he came to Rafiqui's aid. Since the formation was low on fuel and daylight, along with Rafiqui's jammed guns, they decided to head back to base but were suddenly bounced by two more IAF hunters (flown by Flt Lt D N Rathore and Flg Off V K Neb). Rathore attacked Rafiqui while Neb engaged Younas. In the ensuing dogfight, both Rafiqui and Younas were shot down while Cecil Chaudhry managed to escape. Rathore who had ambushed Rafiqui managed to score several hits on Rafiqui's Sabre which suddenly banked sharply to the left and then crashed into the ground near  the village of Heren which was around six miles away from Halwara. He was declared Missing In Action by the Pakistan Air Force but after his absence in Prisoner Exchanges after the war, the PAF officially declared him as KIA. According to reports, Rafiqui is buried in an unmarked grave near Halwara.

Honors and legacy 
The Pakistan Air Force's third largest air base, PAF Base Shorkot was renamed as PAF Base Rafiqui in honour of Sarfaraz Rafiqui's services and sacrifice. One of the largest roads of the Lahore Cantonment is named Sarfaraz Rafiqui Road in his honour. Rafiqui Shaheed Road in Karachi is also named after him. In PAF Base Peshawar, the road on which the Rear Air Headquarters and Fazaia Degree School & College are located is named Rafiqui Lane in honour of the war hero.

Parents' gesture
The Government of Pakistan awarded 77 acres of prime agriculture land as a recompense with the awards of HJ and SJ, which was bequeathed by Rafiqui's parents to the Sarfraz Rafiqui Welfare Trust.

Awards and decorations

Hilal-i-Jur’at Citation 
For his bold leadership displayed over Halwara, Rafiqui was awarded Hilal-i-Jur'at, the second highest gallantry award of Pakistan.

His Hilal-i-Jur'at citation read as follows:

See also

Imtiaz Bhatti
Joseph C. McConnell

References

External links
Sqn Ldr Sarfraz Ahmed Rafiqui HJ, SJ | Shaheed of 1965 War

1935 births
1965 deaths
Pakistan Air Force officers
Pakistani aviators
Aviators killed by being shot down
Pakistani military personnel killed in action
Pilots of the Indo-Pakistani War of 1965
Recipients of Sitara-e-Jurat
Recipients of Hilal-i-Jur'at
Pakistani people of Bengali descent
St. Anthony's High School, Lahore alumni
D. J. Sindh Government Science College alumni
People from Rajshahi District